Ibertrans Aérea was an airline based in Madrid, Spain. It was established in 1991 and operated passenger and cargo services, including charters and wet leases for other airlines. Its main base was Madrid Barajas International Airport.

Fleet 

The Ibertrans Aérea fleet included the following aircraft (at March 2007):

1 Embraer EMB 120ER Brasilia
1 Embraer EMB 120RT Brasilia
2 Fairchild Merlin IV

Accidents 
 On 19 February 1998, two people, the commander and the pilot died when an Ibertrans general aviation plane crash in the borough of Gavà shortly after taking off from Barcelona's international airport.

References 

Defunct airlines of Spain
Airlines established in 1991
Spanish companies established in 1991